Goth culture or Gothic culture may refer to:

 
 Goth subculture

See also
Goth (disambiguation)
Gothic (disambiguation)